The 1961–62 NBA season was the 16th season of the National Basketball Association.  The season ended with the Boston Celtics winning their 4th straight NBA title, beating the Los Angeles Lakers 4 games to 3 in the NBA Finals.

Notable occurrences
 The Chicago Packers entered the league, bringing the number of teams to nine.
 The NBA schedule was expanded for the third consecutive season.  This time it went from 79 games per team, to 80.
 The Philadelphia Warriors played their final season before their transcontinental relocation to San Francisco for the following season.  The NBA would return to Philadelphia in 1963.
 The 1962 NBA All-Star Game was played in St. Louis, Missouri, with the West beating the East 150–130.  Local favorite Bob Pettit won the game's MVP award.
 In a game played in Hershey, Pennsylvania, Wilt Chamberlain made history by scoring 100 points in the Philadelphia Warriors 169–147 win over the New York Knicks. It still stands as one of the greatest individual feats in sports history. Chamberlain would go on to average 50.4 points per game that season, another record.
 This year witnessed the first occurrence of a player averaging a triple-double throughout an entire season when Oscar Robertson averaged 30.8 points, 11.4 assists, and 12.5 rebounds per game.
 This was the last season of the NBA on NBC, the network would regain NBA coverage starting in the 1990–91 season.

Final standings

Eastern Division

Western Division

x – clinched playoff spot

Playoffs

Statistics leaders

Note: Prior to the 1969–70 season, league leaders in points, rebounds, and assists were determined by totals rather than averages.

NBA awards
Most Valuable Player: Bill Russell, Boston Celtics
Rookie of the Year: Walt Bellamy, Chicago Packers

All-NBA First Team:
F – Elgin Baylor, Los Angeles Lakers
F – Bob Pettit, St. Louis Hawks
C – Wilt Chamberlain, Philadelphia Warriors
G – Oscar Robertson, Cincinnati Royals
G – Jerry West, Los Angeles Lakers

All-NBA Second Team:
F – Tom Heinsohn, Boston Celtics
F – Jack Twyman, Cincinnati Royals
C – Bill Russell, Boston Celtics
G – Bob Cousy, Boston Celtics
G – Richie Guerin, New York Knicks

Individual statistics 

The 1961–62 season is notable for having some of the most impressive individual season statistics ever. A number of records were set this season, some of which still stand to this day. Below is a table showcasing some of the most significant individual per game statistics of the season.

When comparing these players to the 2014–15 NBA league leaders, 7 of these players would win the scoring title, 5 would win the rebounding title and 1 would win the assist title.

References
1961–62 NBA Season Summary basketball-reference.com. Retrieved March 30, 2010.